Blue Girl is an American drama short film, written and directed by Kabir McNeely. The film stars Bella Murphy with Adele Rudnick, Ana-Claire Henley, Kabir McNeely, Celeste Caseria and Jamie Uhtof in supporting roles. Set in a virtual homeroom class, the film follows a young high-schooler named Katie who comes out to her class as a lesbian.

Plot
Set in a Zoom homeroom class, a young high school student named Katie comes out as a lesbian. Longing for love and acceptance, she is left defenseless by her teacher Valerie to face a homophobic bully and a disappointed friend.

Cast
Bella Murphy as Katie, a lesbian high school student
Adele Rudnick as Mara, a high school bully
Jamie Uhtof as Valerie, Katie's homeroom teacher
Ana-Claire Henley as Jenny, one of Katie's friends
Kabir McNeely as Connor, an unsupportive former best friend
Celeste Caseria as Chloe, a closeted bisexual classmate

Maeve Tuma, Lussi Salmela, Ari Khavin, Olivia Hobbs, Courtney McDanald, Sarah Sevak, Massina Commesso, Vanesa Ferizoli, Emilia Wagner, Safia Ait Hmidane and Daisy Donaldson also feature in minor roles as other classmates.

Reception

Critical response
Blue Girl received mixed reviews. The film was broadcast at the Commonwealth Club during an interview with Kabir McNeely.

Awards and nominations
Blue Girl has received several award wins and nominations from film festivals including the IndieX Film Festival.

References

External links

2020 films
2020 LGBT-related films
LGBT-related drama films
American teen LGBT-related films
Lesbian-related films
2020s American films